Comprised of is an expression in English that means "composed of [constituent parts]". This is thought by language purists to be a misunderstanding of the basic concept, because "comprise" means "that which encompasses the whole", whereas "composed of" refers to the individual parts of the whole. Nevertheless, the subtle difference between "the whole" and "that which makes up the whole" has led to acquiescence among many language professionals who now accept the phrases "comprised of" and "composed of" as equivalent.

The Cambridge Advanced Learner's Dictionary, Collins English Dictionary and the Oxford Dictionaries regard the form comprised of as standard English usage. This is predicated on its widespread use in both writing and speech. 

Despite this, there continues to be resistance to accepting the phrase "comprised of". In 2015, media outlets reported on one Wikipedia editor's efforts to expunge the phrase from any and all articles on the online encyclopedia.

Use 
The phrase comprised of has been in use in its current meaning since the early 18th century, and has been used by major novelists, intellectuals and essayists.

Some examples (emphasis added):
 "For so tho' a Triangle in the most simple and precise Conception of it be only a Figure comprised of three right Lines, yet these three Lines will necessarily make three Angles, and these three Angles will be equal to two right ones, &c." (1704)
 "Not Punch, nor salmagundi, nor any other Drink or Meat, of more repugnant Compounds, can be comprised of more contrary Ingredients, nor work more different Effects in the various Minds of Men and Women, than that sublime! groveling! joyful! melancholy! flourishing! ruinous! happy! distracting! whimsical, and unaccountable, tame, mad Monster, Love!" (1752)
 "The supper having been removed, and nothing but the dessert, which is comprised of the choicest fruits, and confectionery in all its various forms and claſſes remaining, the party stand prepared for the attack ..." (1818)
 "So the younger division of the party, comprised of Nellie Cahill and Edith Paulton, fell to the rear, and the other division kept the front." (1886)
 "I started another sketch on the strength of this statement, but feeling a bit dubious over his assertion that the one tree was comprised of a whole row, I tackled the 'oldest inhabitant,' an ancient and pensioned park-keeper, who luckily hove in sight." (1902)
 "The body-covering of birds is, without exception, comprised of feathers, and by this character alone birds may be distinguished from all other animals." (1911)

 "The mining towns are comprised of the sudden erections which sprung from the finding of gold in the neighbourhood, and are generally surrounded by thick forest." Anthony Trollope, 1873
 "One element of the immediate feelings of the concrescent subject is comprised of the anticipatory feelings of the transcendent future in its relation to the immediate fact." Alfred North Whitehead 1929
 "There is a dead nerveless area on the Left, comprised of the old sense of paralysis before the horror of the gas chamber." Norman Mailer, 1968
 ”The dualism to which Sartre refers is that of the unconscious id, which is wholly comprised of the instinctual drives, and the conscious ego.” Lionel Trilling, 1972
 ”The book is comprised of a few of the innumerable letters, statements, speeches and articles delivered by me since 1963.” Bertrand Russell, 1967
 ”’The Auroras of Autumn’ is comprised of ten sections, each of unrhymed tercets.” Harold Bloom, 2003
 "I never set out to 'write' a memoir — the book called 'A Widow’s Story' is comprised of journal entries from Feb. 11, 2008, through Aug. 29, 2008." Joyce Carol Oates, 2011
 ”The House of the Spirits is, or rather retrospectively it became, the last of a trilogy that is comprised of itself, preceded by Daughter of Fortune and Portrait in Sepia.” Christopher Hitchens, 2011

Among more recent examples, the Merriam Webster Dictionary attributes "about 8 percent of our military forces are comprised of women" to former US President Jimmy Carter. The phrase has also been used in several newspapers, including The Washington Post, The New Yorker, The Atlantic and The New York Times.

In U.S. patents 
Comprised of is used in U.S. patents as a transition phrase that means "consisting at least of".  It is a less-common form of comprises.  134,000 U.S. patents included the phrase.

In U.S. law 
In the context of legal usage, American lexicographer Bryan A. Garner writes that "The phrase is comprised of is always wrong and should be replaced by either is composed of or comprises." (American linguist Mark Liberman points out that the U.S. Code "apparently includes some 1,880 instances of 'comprised of', and changing them will require many acts of Congress...")

Syntax 

Although comprise is a verb, comprised is an adjective if it takes as its complement a preposition phrase headed by of. The distinction between the verb comprise (of course including preterite and past participle "comprised") and adjective comprised is perhaps most easily understood via compose(d):

Treatments of this topic nearly always mistakenly speak of is composed of and is comprised of as passives. They aren't. Compose in its musical/literary sense does have a passive (The Moonlight Sonata was composed by Beethoven), but the part/whole sense doesn't. Nobody says *Brass is composed by copper and zinc. Instead we get Brass is composed of copper and zinc – and there is no understood by-phrase.

Specifically, the word comprised in the phrase comprised of is a participial adjective. English has a number of adjectives that take as their complements preposition phrases headed by of. Common examples include afraid ("He's afraid of spiders"), aware ("They were aware of the dangers"), and convinced ("They became convinced of their strength").

In the process of conversion from verb to adjective, complementation may change. The verb comprise does not license a preposition phrase headed by of: its meaning aside, *"The book comprises of a hundred pages" is ungrammatical. However, the adjective comprised requires it: both *"The book is comprised a hundred pages" and *"The book is comprised" are ungrammatical. Grammatically, this is patterned on the conversion of verb compose to adjective composed (although semantically, matters are more complex). However, the sentence "the book comprises a hundred pages" is neither ungrammatical nor tautological.

In Malaysian English 
In Malaysian English, both the adjective comprised and the verb comprise can take a preposition phrase headed by of, as in: "According to our analysis, the voters comprise of 297 Malays, 469 Chinese, 39 Indians and four from other races".

Semantics 

The Oxford English Dictionary (OED) shows that the verb comprise has been used with a range of meanings. In its earliest known uses (from 1423), it seems to mean "To lay hold on, take, catch, seize", a sense now obsolete. The word comes from French  (which itself comes from Latin), but while the OED does not call obsolete every comprehension-related sense of comprise, its newest examples are from the 1850s. The OED presents "Of things material: To contain, as parts making up the whole, to consist of (the parts specified)" as the fourth sense, first encountered in 1481. (However, it notes that "Many of the early passages in which this word occurs are so vague that it is difficult to gather the exact sense.") In the English of the 20th and 21st centuries, the part/whole meanings have been overwhelmingly important. Two are exemplified in:

 "The committee comprises three judges."
 "Three judges comprise the committee".

The former is not disputed. The latter is less common, and is disputed. It may be the result of a centuries-old malapropism for compose, a malapropism that caught on. Malapropism or no, it is now well established. The OED gives use 8.b of comprise as "to constitute, make up, compose", and dates this back to 1794; and it has been used by respected writers (for example, Charles Dickens).

One may say "The committee is composed of three judges", and also "Three judges compose the committee". Although the former is not a passive clause (as explained in "Syntax", above), it behaves like one semantically.

However, with the meaning of comprise that is the commonest (and is not disputed), the parallel pair is not possible for comprise(d). Instead, it is only possible for the pair %"The committee is comprised of three judges", and %"Three judges comprise the committee", both disputed. (Very few native speakers of Standard English would accept *"Three judges are comprised of the committee".)

Evaluation 
Comprised of is often deprecated. The authors of The Blue Book of Grammar and Punctuation state that comprised of is never correct because the word comprise by itself already means "composed of".
CliffsNotes says "don't use the phrase 'is comprised of and does not include an explanation.

The acceptance of the phrase has increased in recent decades. In the 1960s, 53 percent of the writers and editors on the Usage Panel of the American Heritage Dictionary found comprised of unacceptable. In 1996, this percentage had declined to 35 percent, and by 2011, only 32 percent of the Usage Panel's membership objected to the use of comprised of.

As one of "7 grammar rules you really should pay attention to", University of Delaware journalism and English professor Ben Yagoda says "Don't use comprised of. Instead use composed of/made up of."

The style guide for the British newspapers The Guardian and The Observer says that "The one thing [about comprise, consist, compose or constitute] to avoid, unless you want people who care about such things to give you a look composed of, consisting of and comprising mingled pity and contempt, is 'comprised of. Reuters' style guide also advises against using the phrase, as does the IBM style guide.

Simon Heffer elaborated on a short warning in his book Strictly English with a longer one in his Simply English: "A book may comprise fifteen chapters, but it is not comprised of them. Those who say or write such a thing are confusing it with composed of. Another correct way to make the point would be to say that the book 'was constituted of fifteen chapters' or that 'the fifteen chapters constituted the book'."

Certain usage guides warn their readers about the meaning of comprise – despite the appearance within respected dictionaries of the use they deprecate (see "Semantics") – but do not mention comprised of. These include Gowers and Fraser's The Complete Plain Words and the style guides of The Economist and The Times. Other usage compendia have no comment on either comprised of or comprise. Although the Oxford English Dictionary notes that certain usages of other words are disparaged, it does not comment on the acceptability of comprised of (which it glosses as "To be composed of, to consist of").

Overt defenses of comprised of are uncommon, but Harvard University psychology professor Steven Pinker considers its deprecation to be one of "a few fuss-budget decrees you can safely ignore". Oliver Kamm defends it, together with the verb comprise used in the active voice: "Merriam-Webster observes that this disputed usage has been in existence for more than a century. The active version of the disputed usage is older still. Neither is unclear in the context; both are legitimate." Conversely, Edinburgh University linguistics professor Geoffrey K. Pullum writes "I'd happily comply with an edict limiting comprise to its original sense … I see no reason to favor the inverted sense. There’s nothing virtuous about the ambiguity and auto-antonymy it promotes. It's easier than you’d think for unclarity to arise about whether an author is saying some abstract X makes up Y or that it consists of Y."

Variants
According to the Oxford Dictionaries, the related construction "x comprises of y and z" is considered incorrect.

Removal from Wikipedia
In 2015, many media outlets, starting with Backchannel, reported that Wikipedia editor  had manually removed tens of thousands of instances of the phrase comprised of from the encyclopedia. Some coverage praised the work as a uniquely focused effort for correctness, but others criticized it as grammatically misguided. Linguist Geoffrey K. Pullum expressed approval of the principle but also doubt about its practicality, saying he would be happy for the editor's "clarifying mission" to succeed. However, Pullum said he "wouldn't bet a dime on his success." Fellow-linguist Geoffrey Nunberg has described Henderson's ongoing efforts against the use of the phrase as a "jihad" and an "example of the pedant's veto", and said that the Wikipedia community was "resigned to letting him have his way" despite his mission being illogical.

Notes

References

External links

 

Linguistic purism
English usage controversies
Nonstandard English grammar
English phrases